These are My Roots: Clifford Jordan Plays Leadbelly is an album featuring jazz saxophonist Clifford Jordan performing tunes associated with Huddie "Lead Belly" Ledbetter which was recorded in 1965 and released on the Atlantic label.

Reception

The Allmusic site awarded the album 4 stars with the review by Scott Yanow stating, "Overall, this project is an unexpected success -- one would not have thought that Clifford Jordan and Leadbelly had that much in common!"

Track listing
All compositions are Traditional except as indicated
 "Dick's Holler" – 4:53
 "Silver City Bound" – 2:41   
 "Take This Hammer" – 4:18
 "Black Betty" – 2:59
 "The Highest Mountain" (Clifford Jordan) – 4:17
 "Goodnight Irene" (Huddie Ledbetter) – 4:29
 "De Gray Goose" – 3:38
 "Black Girl" – 4:22
 "Jolly O' the Ransom" – 2:22
 "Yellow Gal" – 4:27

Personnel
Clifford Jordan — tenor saxophone
Roy Burrowes  – trumpet 
Julian Priester – trombone
Cedar Walton – piano
Chuck Wayne – banjo 
Richard Davis – bass
Albert Heath – drums
Sandra Douglas – vocals (tracks 3 & 8)

References

1965 albums
Clifford Jordan albums
Atlantic Records albums